Erling Eugene "Dinger" Doane (October 14, 1893 – June, 1948) was an American football player. He excelled at football at Somerville High School from 1912 to 1914 before being a standout at Tufts University where he scored a touchdown in Tufts first formal win over Harvard in 1916. Following his college career, he played professionally in the National Football League with the  Cleveland Tigers, Milwaukee Badgers, Detroit Panthers, Pottsville Maroons, Providence Steam Roller and the New York Brickley Giants. Brickley's New York Giants are not related to the modern-day New York Giants. He joined the pre-NFL Frankford Yellow Jackets briefly in 1921 for a game against the Union Quakers of Philadelphia.

References

1893 births
1949 deaths
American football fullbacks
American football halfbacks
Cleveland Tigers (NFL) players
Detroit Panthers players
Frankford Yellow Jackets players
Milwaukee Badgers players
New York Brickley Giants players
Pottsville Maroons players
Providence Steam Roller players
Tufts Jumbos football players
People from Natick, Massachusetts
Players of American football from Massachusetts
Sportspeople from Middlesex County, Massachusetts